"Phendula" is a song by South African singer Zahara. It was released on September 6, 2013, serving as the lead single from her second studio album of the same name. The song peaked at number 6 on the South African EMA Airplay Chart on October 8, 2013.

Background and live performances
In a nutshell, "Phendula" is a prayer to God asking for the eradication of human suffering and hardship. Zahara performed the song for the first time on Live AMP. She also performed the song at the Boardwalk Casino and Entertainment World on December 8, 2013.

Music video
The music video for "Phendula" was shot in South Africa by Thorn Bubble Films and uploaded to YouTube on September 27, 2013.

Critical reception
"Phendula" received positive reviews from music critics. Furah Mahlangu and Buchule Raba of GoXtra News said the song "left many yearning, and impatient of the release day of the full album as the Twitter buzz hasn't stopped with fans begging for more".

Accolades
"Phendula" was nominated for Song of the Year at the 2014 Metro FM Music Awards.

Charts

References

2013 songs
2013 singles
Zahara (South African musician) songs